Joan Ricketts is a former Welsh international lawn bowler.

Joan was part of the fours team that won the gold medal at the 1986 Commonwealth Games in Edinburgh.

References 

Welsh female bowls players
Living people
Commonwealth Games medallists in lawn bowls
Commonwealth Games gold medallists for Wales
Year of birth missing (living people)
Bowls players at the 1986 Commonwealth Games
Medallists at the 1986 Commonwealth Games